The 2015 Nigerian House of Representatives elections in Taraba State was held on March 28, 2015, to elect members of the House of Representatives to represent Taraba State, Nigeria.

Overview

Summary

Results

Bali/Gassol 
APC candidate Garba Hamman-Julde Chede won the election, defeating other party candidates.

Jalingo/Yorro/Zing 
APC candidate Aminu Ibrahim Malle won the election, defeating other party candidates.

Karim Lamido/Lau/Ardo-Kola 
PDP candidate Baido Danladi Tijos won the election, defeating other party candidates.

Sardauna/Gashaka/Kurmi 
PDP candidate Danasabe Charles Hosea won the election, defeating other party candidates.

Takuma/Donga/Ussa 
PDP candidate Rima M Shawulu Kwewum won the election, defeating other party candidates.

Wukari/Ibi 
APGA candidate Shiddi Usman Danjuma won the election, defeating other party candidates.

References 

Taraba State House of Representatives elections